National Lampoon's Christmas Vacation is a 1989 American Christmas comedy film and the third installment in National Lampoon magazine's Vacation film series. Christmas Vacation was directed by Jeremiah S. Chechik, written and co-produced by John Hughes, and starring Chevy Chase, Beverly D'Angelo, and Randy Quaid with supporting roles by Miriam Flynn, William Hickey, Mae Questel, Diane Ladd, John Randolph, E.G. Marshall, Doris Roberts, Juliette Lewis, and Johnny Galecki, and special appearances by Julia Louis-Dreyfus, Nicholas Guest, Ellen Hamilton Latzen, Brian Doyle-Murray, and Natalia Nogulich.

Based on Hughes' short story "Christmas '59" that was published in National Lampoon, it tells the story of the Griswold family spending Christmas vacation at home with their relatives and the ensuing mayhem.

The film performed well at the box office, grossing $73.3 million against a $25 million budget while receiving generally mixed reviews from critics. It is now regarded as a classic Christmas film.

Plot 
Chicago-area resident Clark Griswold intends to have a great Christmas with his entire family. He drives his wife Ellen and children Audrey and Rusty out to the country to find a tree, ultimately choosing the largest one they can find. Realizing too late that they did not bring any tools to cut down the tree, they are forced to uproot it instead. Clark's holiday plans inadvertently cause steadily escalating chaos for the family's yuppie neighbors, Todd and Margo Chester.

When both Clark's and Ellen's parents arrive for Christmas, their bickering quickly begins to annoy the family. However, Clark maintains a positive attitude and remains undeterred in his plans. He covers the house's entire exterior with thousands of lights, which temporarily cause a citywide power shortage once he gets them to work properly. 

Ellen's cousin Catherine and her redneck husband Eddie arrive unannounced with two of their younger children, Rocky and Ruby Sue, and their pet Rottweiler, Snots. Eddie later admits they are living in the RV in which they arrived, as he went broke and had to sell their home and land. Clark offers to buy gifts for Eddie's kids so they can still enjoy Christmas. Soon afterward, Clark's senile Aunt Bethany and cantankerous Uncle Lewis arrive.

Clark begins to wonder why his boss, Frank Shirley, has not given him his yearly bonus, which he desperately needs to pay for a new swimming pool. After a disastrous Christmas Eve dinner, during which Aunt Bethany's cat is electrocuted and Uncle Lewis accidentally burns down the Christmas tree while lighting his cigar, a courier delivers an envelope. Instead of the bonus Clark expects, it is a membership in a jelly club. He snaps and angrily wishes for Frank to be delivered to the house so he can insult him to his face. 

Taking Clark's request literally, Eddie kidnaps Frank, who admits to canceling the Christmas bonuses but then reinstates them in the face of Clark's chastisement. Meanwhile, Frank's wife Helen calls the police, and a SWAT team storms the Griswold house and holds everyone at gunpoint. Frank decides not to press charges and explains the situation to his wife and the SWAT leader, both of whom scold him for canceling the bonuses until he reveals his change of heart.

The family goes outside when Rocky and Ruby Sue believe they see Santa Claus in the distance. Clark tells them it is actually the Christmas Star and that he finally realizes what the holiday means to him. 

Uncle Lewis says that the light is coming from a sewage treatment plant, reminding Clark that Eddie had been dumping his RV sewage into the nearby storm drain. Before Clark can stop him, Uncle Lewis lights another cigar and tosses the match into the drain, causing a giant gas explosion which sets a Santa's sleigh decoration afire and launches it into the sky. Aunt Bethany starts singing "The Star-Spangled Banner" and everyone joins in as the flaming decoration flies into the distance. 

The entire family, along with the Shirleys and the SWAT team, go inside to celebrate while Clark and Ellen share a Christmas kiss. Clark is satisfied that he has provided a great Christmas for his family.

Cast
 Chevy Chase as Clark W. "Sparky" Griswold Jr.
 Beverly D'Angelo as Ellen Griswold
 Juliette Lewis as Audrey Griswold. Audrey was previously portrayed by Dana Barron and Dana Hill in the last two films and later by Marisol Nichols in Vegas Vacation
 Johnny Galecki as Russell "Rusty" Griswold. Russ was portrayed by Anthony Michael Hall and Jason Lively in the previous two films and later by Ethan Embry in Vegas Vacation. Notably, this is the only film in which Rusty and Audrey are the same age, hence Lewis being taller than Galecki. 
 John Randolph as Clark Griswold Sr., Clark's father
 Diane Ladd as Nora Griswold, Clark's mother
 E. G. Marshall as Arthur "Art" Smith, Ellen's father
 Doris Roberts as Frances Smith, Ellen's mother
 Miriam Flynn as Catherine Johnson, Ellen's cousin
 Randy Quaid as Eddie Johnson, Catherine's husband
 Cody Burger as Rocky Johnson
 Ellen Hamilton Latzen as Ruby Sue Johnson
 William Hickey as Uncle Lewis
 Mae Questel as Aunt Bethany (Questel's final film role before her death in 1998)
 Sam McMurray as Bill, Clark's co-worker
 Julia Louis-Dreyfus as Margo Chester, the Griswolds' yuppie neighbor
 Nicholas Guest as Todd Chester, Margo's husband
 Brian Doyle-Murray as Frank Shirley, Clark's boss
 Natalia Nogulich as Helen Shirley, Frank's wife
 Nicolette Scorsese as Mary, a lingerie counter clerk
 Alexander Folk as Lead SWAT Officer
 Jeremy Roberts as cop
 Woody Weaver as cop
 Doug Llewelyn as the voice of the Parade Announcer
 Keith MacKechnie as delivery boy
 Rick Stevens as Ralph, Ellen's awkward cousin

Production

Development and writing
National Lampoon's Christmas Vacation originated from a short story by writer John Hughes called "Christmas '59", which was published in the December 1980 issue of National Lampoon magazine. "The studio came to me and begged for another one, and I only agreed because I had a good story to base it on," said Hughes. "But those movies have become little more than Chevy Chase vehicles." Director Chris Columbus initially was to direct the film, but due to a personality clash between him and Chase, Columbus left the film and was replaced by Chechik. Hughes eventually gave Columbus the script to Home Alone.

Filming
Principal photography began on March 27, 1989, in Summit County, Colorado, with footage shot in Silverthorne, Breckenridge, and Frisco. From there the production moved to Warner Bros. Ranch Facilities in Burbank, California, where the set of the Griswold family's house and street is located.

Music
The musical score for National Lampoon's Christmas Vacation was composed by Angelo Badalamenti. It is the only installment of the Vacation film series not to include Lindsey Buckingham's "Holiday Road". In its place is a song entitled "Christmas Vacation" with music by Barry Mann, lyrics by Cynthia Weil and performed by Mavis Staples of The Staple Singers fame. The song was covered in 2007 by High School Musical star Monique Coleman for the 2007 Christmas album Disney Channel Holiday. Popular Christmas songs featured in the film include Bing Crosby & The Andrews Sisters Hawaiian-themed "Mele Kalikimaka", and, during the climax of the film, Gene Autry's "Here Comes Santa Claus". For the latter song, Autry's re-recorded 1957 Challenge Records version is used.

Despite several popular songs being present in the film, no official soundtrack album was released. In 1999, a bootleg copy containing music featured in the film along with select cuts of dialogue dubbed as the "10th Anniversary Limited Edition" began to appear on Internet auction sites with the claim that Warner Bros. and RedDotNet had pressed 20,000 CDs for Six Flags Magic Mountain employees to sell to customers entering the park but that only 7,000 had been sold and now the remainder were being made available to the public. However forums at movie music sites such as SoundtrackCollector later declared the disc to be a bootleg due to its inaccuracies. For instance, the cut "Christmas Vacation Medley" (claiming to be the work of composer Angelo Badalamenti) is really a track called "Christmas at Carnegie Hall" from Home Alone 2: Lost in New York by composer John Williams and does not actually contain any of Badalamenti's Christmas Vacation score.

Release

Home media
The film has been released on home media several different times: VHS and Laserdisc in early 1990, a bare bones DVD in 1997, and a "Special Edition" DVD in 2003. HD DVD as well as Blu-ray editions were released in 2006. In 2009, a second Blu-ray of the film was released as an "Ultimate Collector's Edition". A steelbook Blu-ray was released in 2015 with remastered picture quality, and a second steelbook was released in 2019.  On November 1, 2022, the film was released on 4K Ultra HD for the first time.

Reception

Box office
The movie debuted at No. 2 at the box-office while grossing $11,750,203 during the opening weekend, behind Back to the Future Part II. The movie eventually topped the box-office charts in its third week of release and remained #1 the following weekend. It went on to gross a total of $71,319,546 in the United States while showing in movie theaters. It was the highest-grossing film in the series, until the release of Vacation in 2015.

Critical response
At the time of the film's release, the film received mixed to positive reviews; however, over time, many have cited it as a Christmas classic. The site's consensus reads, "While Christmas Vacation may not be the most disciplined comedy, it's got enough laughs and good cheer to make for a solid seasonal treat." Another review aggregation website, Metacritic, assigned the film a rating of 49 out of 100 based on 18 reviews, indicating "mixed or average reviews". Audiences polled by CinemaScore gave the film an average grade of "B+" on an A+ to F scale.

Entertainment magazine Variety responded positively to the film stating, "Solid family fare with plenty of yucks, National Lampoon's Christmas Vacation is Chevy Chase and brood doing what they do best. Despite the title, which links it to previous pics in the rambling Vacation series, this third entry is firmly rooted at the Griswold family homestead, where Clark Griswold (Chase) is engaged in a typical over-reaching attempt to give his family a perfect, old-fashioned Christmas." Rita Kempley of The Washington Post gave the film a positive review explaining that "it will prove pater-familiar to fans of the 1983 original and the European Vacation sequel. Only it's a bit more whimsical."

Roger Ebert of the Chicago Sun-Times gave the film two out of four stars, saying, "The movie is curious in how close it comes to delivering on its material: Sequence after sequence seems to contain all the necessary material, to be well on the way toward a payoff, and then it somehow doesn't work."

Other media

Sequel

The fourth film in the series, Vegas Vacation, would follow in 1997, without the involvement of either Hughes or National Lampoon.

Spin-off/sequel

In 2003, NBC aired a spin-off called National Lampoon's Christmas Vacation 2 which featured Cousin Eddie's family on a Christmas vacation in the South Pacific. Randy Quaid, Miriam Flynn, and Dana Barron reprise their roles from the previous Vacation films alongside series newcomers Jake Thomas, Edward Asner, Sung Hi Lee, and Fred Willard.

In popular culture
In 2012, Chevy Chase, Beverly D’Angelo, and Juliette Lewis reunited for Christmas Vacation-themed ads for Old Navy. The series of ads also featured the other actors who portrayed past versions of Russ and Audrey.

In 2020, Chase and D'Angelo reprised their roles as Clark and Ellen in a Ford commercial for the Ford Mustang Mach-E spoofing the house lighting scene.

The movie has inspired the theme for various Christmas lights and decoration displays over the years.

See also
 List of National Lampoon films
 List of Christmas films

References

External links

 
 
 

1989 films
1989 comedy films
1989 directorial debut films
1980s black comedy films
1980s Christmas comedy films
1980s English-language films
American black comedy films
American Christmas comedy films
American sequel films
Films about families
Films about vacationing
Films based on American short stories
Films directed by Jeremiah S. Chechik
Films produced by John Hughes (filmmaker)
Films scored by Angelo Badalamenti
Films set in Chicago
Films shot in Burbank, California
Films shot in Colorado
Films with screenplays by John Hughes (filmmaker)
National Lampoon's Vacation (film series)
Warner Bros. films
1980s American films